WKQB is a Hot Adult Contemporary formatted broadcast radio station licensed to Pocahontas, Virginia, serving Bluefield and Bland in Virginia and Bluefield and Princeton in West Virginia.  WKQB is owned and operated by West Virginia-Virginia Holding Company, LLC.

References

External links

1990 establishments in Virginia
Hot adult contemporary radio stations in the United States
Radio stations established in 1990
KQB